Bruce Sandford (born 18 July 1962) is a New Zealand skeleton racer who has competed in the late 1980s and early 1990s. He won a gold medal in the men's skeleton event at the 1992 FIBT World Championships in Calgary.

Until 2012 when his nephew, Ben Sandford, won a bronze medal at the 2012 World Championships, Bruce was the only person from the Southern Hemisphere to medal in bobsleigh, luge, or skeleton at the Winter Olympic or World Championship level.

References
Men's skeleton world championship medalists since 1989
Skeletonsport.com profile

1962 births
Living people
New Zealand male skeleton racers